Sycamore Partners is a private equity firm based in New York specializing in retail and consumer investments. The firm has approximately $10 billion in aggregate committed capital.

History

Founding
Sycamore Partners was founded in 2011 by Stefan Kaluzny and Peter Morrow. Before Sycamore, Kaluzny was a Managing Partner at Golden Gate Capital and was employed since the firm's inception.  Prior to joining Golden Gate, he co-founded Delray Farms, Inc. and also served as its Chief Executive Officer. Kaluzny received a BA from Yale University and an MBA from Harvard Business School. Morrow served as a Principal at Golden Gate before co-founding Sycamore. Peter Morrow received a BA from Stanford University and an MBA from Stanford Graduate School of Business.

Holdings

Current 
CommerceHub
Staples (Acquired 2017)
Pure Fishing (Acquired January 2019)
Brands include: ABU Garcia, All Star, Berkley, Chub, Fenwick, Greys, Hardy, Hodgman, Johnson, JRC, Mitchell, Penn, Pflueger, Sebile, Shakespeare, SpiderWire, Stren, and Ugly Stik. 
Belk (Acquired 2015)
Hot Topic (Acquired 2013)
MGF Sourcing
NBG Home
Talbots (Acquired 2012)
The Limited (Acquired 2017)
Torrid (acquired 2013)
 Premium Apparel LLC (affiliate of Sycamore Partners used to acquire Ann Taylor, Lane Bryant and related brands from Ascena Retail Group in December 2020.)
Ann Taylor
Lane Bryant (Cacique)
LOFT
Lou & Grey
Azamara Cruises (Acquired January 2021)
Express, Inc. (January 2021)

Former 
EMP Merchandising sold to Warner Music Group in 2018. 
Nine West Holdings (2013-2018)
Jones New York sold to Authentic Brands Group in 2015. 
Nine West sold to Authentic Brands Group in 2018. 
Bandolino sold to Authentic Brands Group in 2018. 
Kurt Geiger Acquired by Jones Apparel Group in 2011. Sold to Cinven in 2015. 
Stuart Weitzman sold to Coach, Inc. (now known as Tapestry, Inc.) in 2015. 
Coldwater Creek (2014-2020) assets sold to Hong Kong procurement company Newtimes Group in 2020.

Recent Investments 
In 2011, Sycamore acquired a 51% stake in MGF Sourcing, finally completing the total takeover in 2015.

In 2012 the firm acquired Talbots for $391 million.

In 2013, Sycamore acquired Hot Topic and Torrid for $600 million.

In 2014, the firm acquired Coldwater Creek, Jones New York for $2.2 billion which was then sold to Authentic Brands Group in 2015. Kurt Geiger which was then sold to Cinven in 2015. Sycamore also sold the Stuart Weitzman business to Coach, Inc. in 2015 for $574 million.

In 2015, the firm acquired Belk, Inc for $3 billion, and EMP Merchandising, whilst divesting Pathlight Capital

In 2017, Sycamore's Nine West Holdings acquired Kasper and Sycamore Partners purchased NBG Home. The firm then went onto win the bid for The Limited, bidding $26.8 million. In June 2017, Reuters reported that Staples Inc. had agreed to sell itself for $6.9 billion. Sycamore also sold over 300 Dollar Express stores to rival, Dollar General.

In July 2020, it was announced that Sycamore Partners had made a $1.75B offer to acquire department store chain and competitor JCPenney out of bankruptcy, and would rebrand 250 JCPenney stores to the Belk name, to help the chain compete directly with Macy's. Under the plan, the remaining JCPenney stores will be liquidated. The plan was not selected.

In January 2021 Sycamore Partners bought Azamara Cruises from the Royal Caribbean Group.

On March 16, 2022, it was announced the Sycamore and Hudson's Bay Company are preparing bids to buy Kohl's.

On November 3, 2022, Lowe's announced that it has entered into a definitive agreement to sell its Canadian retail business to Sycamore Partners.

References

Private equity firms of the United States
Financial services companies based in New York City
Financial services companies established in 2011
2011 establishments in New York City
Privately held companies based in New York City